Chris Ramsey (born 12 November 1976) is a British adventurer and sustainable living advocate, who became the first person to drive the Mongol Rally in an electric vehicle.

He also holds the Guinness World Record for the longest distance traveled on an electric bike in 12 hours, covering a distance of 180.75 miles at the Grampian Transport Museum in Alford, Aberdeenshire.

Career

In 2011, Ramsey founded Plug In Adventures to support his goal of promoting electric vehicle adoption by demonstrating their capabilities in the harshest climates on Earth.

His adventuring began in 2015 when he and his wife took just two days to finish the 1,652-mile journey from John O'Groats to Land's End and back again in a 24kWh Nissan Leaf, using only publicly available and free EV charging points.

In April 2016 Ramsey completed the 516-mile North Coast 500 in a 30kWh Nissan Leaf.

Mongol Rally Entry
In 2017 Ramsey entered his own Nissan Leaf  in the Mongol Rally, becoming the first driver of an electric vehicle to compete in the 10,000-mile competition.

That year's rally began at Goodwood Circuit in England and ended in the Siberian city of Ulan-Ude,  miles north of the Mongolian capital Ulaanbaatar.

The 30kWh Nissan Leaf had a 155-mile range on a single charge and featured light modifications to cope with the terrain on the rally. These modifications included Speedline SL2 Marmora wheels and Maxsport RB3 tyres, as well as welded plates beneath the wishbones, an aluminium sump guard and a roof-mounted light bar. Overall the vehicle weighed about  less than the standard version of the car.

Ramsey and his wife, Julie, completed the journey on 4 September 2017, having crossed 20 countries in 56 days.
Speaking at the end of the rally, Ramsey said: "We want to get out there and dispel the myths about electric vehicles, that they're not fun, that you can't drive long distances or over challenging terrain," he said.
"We drove this whole journey with zero tail pipe emissions. For nearly 10,000 miles we spent $105 on electricity. When you think about how much fuel one of the Mongol rally teams would have put in, it would have been $1,500 -- £1,800 worth of petrol. The infrastructure involved in that multiplied by 290 teams -- that's a massive carbon footprint. "

E-Bike Record
On 26 August 2018 Ramsey broke the Guinness World Record for the greatest distance travelled on an e-bike in a 12-hour period.
Using a Volt Pulse hybrid e-bike, he travelled   and maintained an average speed of  breaking the previous record of 110.60 miles set by Prasad Erande in Maharashtra in India. "

Pole to Pole Expedition

On 7 March 2021 Ramsey announced his intention to become the first person to drive a car from Pole to Pole. It is anticipated that the Pole to Pole expedition will cover a range of temperatures from -22 degrees Fahrenheit in the polar regions, to almost 90 degrees Fahrenheit in deserts and tropical zones. 

The Pole to Pole Expedition will be supported by Arctic Trucks, who will provide planning, engineering and logistical support.

On 24 May 2022 Ramsey announced that he had partnered with Nissan for the Pole to Pole expedition, and will be driving a Nissan Ariya from the North Pole to the South Pole, starting in March 2023.

Personal life
Through his adventures, Ramsey has raised money for WWF Scotland.

He also provides educational lecturers to businesses and schools to help them understand the ecological and climate benefits of electric car adoption.

References

External links
 

Living people
1976 births